Leo Kenneth Bustad (January 10, 1920, Stanwood, Washington – September 19, 1998, Pullman, Washington) was a veterinarian, physiologist, and dean of veterinary medicine. He is known for his work on human–animal bonding.

Biography
His parents were Norwegian immigrants. He grew up on a farm and learned Norwegian as his first language — he was introduced to English when his older brother started school. Leo Bustad graduated in 1941 with a bachelor's degree in agriculture from Washington State College (renamed in 1959 as Washington State University) (WSU). Upon his graduation he was commissioned a second lieutenant in the U.S. Army. In June 1942 at the Fort Benning chapel, he married Signe Byrd, a former classmate in Washington state. During WW II, Leo Bustad was in combat in Italy and Germany and spent 15 months as a prisoner of war in a German prison camp. After his return to the U.S.A., he graduated from Washington State College in 1948 with a master's degree in animal nutrition and in 1949 with a D.V.M.

From 1949 to 1965 Bustad performed and directed biological research at the Hanford Laboratories located in the Hanford Site in Washington state. In 1960 he graduated with a Ph.D. in physiology from the University of Washington School of Medicine, with financial assistance from a National Science Foundation postdoctoral fellowship. From 1965 to 1973 he was the director of the Radiobiology Laboratory and Comparative Oncology Laboratory at the University of California, Davis. From 1973 to 1983 at Washington State University's College of Veterinary Medicine, he was a professor of veterinary physiology and dean of the College. Upon his retirement in 1983 he retained the title of professor emeritus and maintained a half-time appointment in WSU's College of Veterinary Medicine. During his career he was the author or co-author of over 200 articles. He was a consultant to the Surgeon General of the U.S. Air Force.

Bustad was the director of the People-Pet Partnership (co-founded by Linda M. Hines) from 1979 to 1998. In 1979 he gave the Wesley Spink Memorial Lecture at the University of Minnesota's Department of Medicine. In 1987 he was of the founders of the journal Anthrozoös. He was the keynote speaker at the opening dedication of the WSU Veterans' Memorial on Veterans Day in 1993.

He was named 1981's Outstanding Veterinarian of the Year by the Washington State Veterinary Medical Association. In 1985, Washington State University dedicated the Veterinary Science Building in his honor and also honored him with the WSU Regents Distinguished Alumnus Award — the 20th alumnus to be recognized with WSU's highest honor. In 1988 he was elected a member of the National Academy of Medicine. Washington State University sponsored a symposium held from October 18 to 20, 2013 in honor of his legacy.

Bustad was predeceased by his wife, Signe Byrd Bustad (1919–1998), and a daughter, Karen Ann Bustad (1949–1983). Upon his death he was survived by a son, a daughter, and a grandson.

Selected publications

Articles

Books
  (reprint of 1964 original edition)
 
 
 
  (1st edition in 1986)
 
  (1st edition in 1990)

References

1920 births
1998 deaths
American veterinarians
American physiologists
Washington State University alumni
University of Washington School of Medicine alumni
University of California, Davis faculty
Washington State University faculty
Members of the National Academy of Medicine
United States Army personnel of World War II